Edward Carol Boyle (December 24, 1904 – June 29, 1981) was the Allegheny County District Attorney in Pittsburgh, Pennsylvania from January 3, 1956, until January 6, 1964.  Mr. Boyle attended Duquesne University School of Law Class of 1928. He was a member of the Democratic Party, serving as a delegate at the 1960 Democratic National Convention.  From 1949 until 1953 he served as U.S. Attorney for the Western District of Pennsylvania.

See also

 District Attorney
 Pittsburgh Police
 Allegheny County Sheriff
 Allegheny County Police Department

References

Lawyers from Pittsburgh
County district attorneys in Pennsylvania
1981 deaths
Pennsylvania Democrats
United States Attorneys for the Western District of Pennsylvania
1904 births
20th-century American lawyers